Josh Oliver Baker (born 16 May 2003) is an English cricketer. He made his first-class debut on 11 July 2021, for Worcestershire in the 2021 County Championship, after signing a rookie contract with the club the previous day. He made his List A debut on 25 July 2021, for Worcestershire in the 2021 Royal London One-Day Cup.

In December 2021, he was named as one of two reserve players England's team for the 2022 ICC Under-19 Cricket World Cup in the West Indies. He made his Twenty20 debut on 25 May 2022, for the Worcestershire Rapids in the 2022 T20 Blast.

References

External links
 

2003 births
Living people
English cricketers
Worcestershire cricketers
Sportspeople from Redditch